Acolastodes is a monotypic snout moth genus in the subfamily Phycitinae. Its only species, Acolastodes oenotripta, is found in Fiji. Both the genus and the species were described by Edward Meyrick in 1934.

References

Phycitinae
Monotypic moth genera
Moths of Fiji
Pyralidae genera